The men's 78 kg competition in judo at the 1992 Summer Olympics in Barcelona was held on 30 July at the Palau Blaugrana. The gold medal was won by Hidehiko Yoshida of Japan.

Results

Main brackets

Pool A

Pool B

Repechages

Repechage A

Repechage B

Final

Final classification

References

External links
 

M78
Judo at the Summer Olympics Men's Half Middleweight
Men's events at the 1992 Summer Olympics